Senator Howard may refer to:

Member of the United States Senate
Guy V. Howard (1879–1954), U.S. Senator from Minnesota from 1936 to 1937
Jacob M. Howard (1805–1871), U.S. Senator from Michigan
John Eager Howard (1752–1827), U.S. Senator from Maryland from 1796 to 1803

United States state senate members
Benjamin Chew Howard (1791–1872), Maryland State Senate
Charles John Howard (1862–1928), Ohio State Senate
Edward L. Howard (1926–2011), Pennsylvania State Senate
Gene C. Howard (born 1926), Oklahoma State Senate
Glenn L. Howard (1939–2012), Indiana State Senate
Gwen Howard (born 1945), Nebraska State Senate
Janet C. Howard (fl. 1990s), Ohio State Senate
Jerry Thomas Howard (born 1936), Missouri State Senate
John J. Howard (1869–1941), New York State Senate
Pierre Howard (born 1943), Georgia State Senate
Raymond Howard (politician) (born 1935), Missouri State Senate
Sara Howard (politician) (born 1981), Nebraska State Senate
Timothy Edward Howard (1837–1916), Indiana State Senate
William Howard (congressman) (1817–1891), Ohio State Senate